Laguna Blanca is a Chilean commune located in Magallanes Province and Region. The commune is administered by the municipality in Villa Tehuelches, that is the major settlement in the whole commune.

Demographics
The population fell by 23.5% (204 persons) between the 1992 and 2002 censuses.

Administration
As a commune, Laguna Blanca is a third-level administrative division of Chile administered by a municipal council, headed by an alcalde who is directly elected every four years. The current alcalde is Fernando Ojeda González (PS).

References

External links
  Municipality of Laguna Blanca

Communes of Chile
Populated places in Magallanes Province